This is the results breakdown of the local elections held in the Community of Madrid on 25 May 2003. The following tables show detailed results in the autonomous community's most populous municipalities, sorted alphabetically.

Overall

City control
The following table lists party control in the most populous municipalities, including provincial capitals (shown in bold). Gains for a party are displayed with the cell's background shaded in that party's colour.

Municipalities

Alcalá de Henares
Population: 179,602

Alcobendas
Population: 95,104

Alcorcón
Population: 149,594

Coslada
Population: 79,862

Fuenlabrada
Population: 179,735

Getafe
Population: 153,868

Leganés
Population: 174,436

Madrid

Population: 3,016,788

Móstoles
Population: 198,819

Parla
Population: 80,545

Torrejón de Ardoz
Population: 101,056

See also
May 2003 Madrilenian regional election
October 2003 Madrilenian regional election

References

Madrid
2003